Benzathine phenoxymethylpenicillin (or benzathine penicillin V) is a penicillin.

Adverse effects

References

Penicillins
Combination drugs